SMS Meteor was an auxiliary cruiser of the Imperial German Navy which operated against Allied shipping during World War I.

Early career
Originally built as the British freighter Vienna in 1903 by Ramage & Ferguson, of Leith, for Curries shipping line.
At the outbreak of war in August 1914 Vienna was at Hamburg and was seized as a prize there. 
To take advantage of her unmistakably British appearance, the Imperial German Navy decided to convert her into an auxiliary cruiser and minelayer. 
She was moved to the Kaiserliche Werft (KWW) in Wilhelmshaven, where she was equipped with two 88 mm guns and two machine guns. She had minelaying equipment installed and a capacity for 347 mines. She was renamed Meteor and commissioned in May 1915 under the command of KK Wolfram von Knorr.

Service history

On 29 May 1915 Meteor set out on her first mission, to lay mines in the White Sea and attack Allied merchant ships engaged in taking coal and other materiel to Russia. In this she had several successes, sinking three freighters and laying her mines, which accounted for another three ships. She returned unharmed in June 1915.

Her second mission, in August 1915, was to lay mines in the Moray Firth, but this was less successful. 
In the course of this operation, while attempting to run the British blockade, Meteor was challenged by the British armed boarding vessel HMS Ramsey, which stopped her for inspection. While stopping to be boarded, Meteor was able to manoeuvre into a firing position, and, suddenly opening fire, she quickly overwhelmed Ramsey, which sank.

Retribution was swift, and several British cruisers in the area, which had received Ramsey report, closed in on her. Notified by an Imperial German Navy airship, which was scouting in the area, Meteor captain decided to scuttle her to avoid capture. This took place on 9 August 1915. Her crew, and the survivors from Ramsey, were rescued by the approaching British cruisers.

Aftermath
Though Meteor had some success, this was short-lived, and she did not survive to repeat her exploits. Also, of the eight ships sunk by her, four were neutral Scandinavian vessels, which did nothing for Germany's relations with her neighbours.

Raiding career
In two voyages Meteor sank five ships, and her mines another five, with a total tonnage in excess more of 17,000 GRT.

Notes

References
Halpern, Paul (1994)  A Naval History of World War I  HB
Hawkins, Nigel (2002) The Starvation Blockades 
Schmalenbach, Paul (1977) German Raiders 

World War I commerce raiders
Auxiliary cruisers of the Imperial German Navy
1903 ships
Ships built in Leith
Maritime incidents in 1915
Scuttled vessels of Germany
World War I shipwrecks in the North Sea